Kathir is an Indian film director, producer, and screenwriter who works predominantly in Tamil cinema.

Early life 
Kathir was born in kalkarai, a small village in the Radhapuram Taluk of Tirunelveli District, state of Tamil Nadu, India. Kathir grew up in a middle-class family as the only son along with his three sisters. His father Subhash was a farmer and mother Isakiammal assisted him in his farming. Kathir had his elementary schooling in kalkarai elementary school. He finished his 5th standard there and joined St. Teresa's school in Vadakangulam. He completed his school studies here. Kathir got into the College of Fine arts and Crafts, Chennai. He did a five-year course in Fine arts and graduated with a Diploma in Fine Arts.

Career
Kathir started out as a poster designer in the film industry, and designed posters for films including Moondram Pirai (1981), Andha 7 Naatkal (1981), Darling, Darling, Darling (1982) and Mani Ratnam's Pagal Nilavu (1985) to make pocket money while he was in college.

He worked as an assistant director for Pandiyarajan and GM Kumar. In 2001, he founded his own production studio Sound Light Studio through which he produced Kadhal Virus. He also distributed the film all over Tamil Nadu. In 1996, Kadhal Desam emerged as the biggest hit of his career grossing 10 crore at the box office. Kathir scripted and was ready to make a film titled I Love You by 1997. After being unable to produce the film himself, he shelved the venture. He moved on to briefly begin pre-production work on a project titled Bangalore in late 1999, before opting not to continue.

Kathir announced a comeback in 2008 and began work on a film titled Manavar Dhinam with Vinay in the lead role. Following a delay, the actor was replaced by Srikanth and a launch was held in 2009 by the production house Ayngaran International. However, the film was later shelved and the pair decided to collaborate for the new venture titled Kodai Vidumurai. The film underwent a change in cast and work on the film, featuring Shaam, began again in July 2012. The film has since failed to make progress.

Personal life
He is married to Shanthinidevi in 2013.

Filmography

References

External links

Tamil film directors
Tamil-language film directors
Tamil screenwriters
Year of birth missing (living people)
Living people
Film producers from Tamil Nadu
People from Tirunelveli
20th-century Indian dramatists and playwrights
20th-century Indian film directors
Kannada screenwriters
Kannada film producers
21st-century Indian film directors
Film directors from Tamil Nadu
Screenwriters from Tamil Nadu